Metahepialus is a genus of moths of the family Hepialidae. There are two described species, all endemic to South Africa.

Species
Metahepialus plurimaculata
Metahepialus xenoctenis

External links
Hepialidae genera

Hepialidae
Exoporia genera